Judith and Holofernes may refer to:

 Judith beheading Holofernes, a Biblical account in the deuterocanonical Book of Judith, often shown in art
 Judith and Holofernes (Donatello), a c. 1460 sculpture by Donatello
 Judith and Holofernes (Mantegna), a c. 1495 painting by Andrea Mantegna
 Judith with the Head of Holofernes (Mantegna), a c. 1495 glue tempera on canvas painting in the grisaille style
 Judith and Holofernes (Preti), a 1653-1656 painting by Mattia Preti
 Judith with the Head of Holofernes (Titian), a c. 1570 painting by Titian
 Judith with the Head of Holofernes (Veronese), a c. 1575–1580 oil-on-canvas painting by Paolo Veronese
 Judith and Holofernes (studio of Tintoretto), a c. 1577 oil painting on canvas by the studio of Jacopo Tintoretto
 Judith Beheading Holofernes (Caravaggio), a 1598–99 painting by Caravaggio
 Judith Slaying Holofernes (Artemisia Gentileschi, Naples), a 1612–1613 painting in the Museo di Capodimonte
 Judith with the Head of Holofernes (Saraceni), a 1610–1615 painting by Carlo Saraceni
 Judith Slaying Holofernes (Artemisia Gentileschi, Florence), a 1620–1621 painting in the Uffizi Gallery
 Judith and her Maidservant with the Head of Holofernes, a 1639–1640 painting by Artemisia Gentileschi
 Judith and Holofernes (Goya), a 1819–1823 painting by Francisco Goya
 Judith and Holofernes (Boulogne), a 1626 painting by Valentin de Boulogne
 Judith and the Head of Holofernes, a 1901 painting by Gustav Klimt
 Judith of Bethulia a 1914 American silent film
 Judith and Holofernes (1929 film), a 1929 Italian silent film
 Judith and Holofernes (1959 film), a 1959 French-Italian film

See also
 Judith Holofernes (born 1976), German musician and author
 Holofernes (disambiguation)